Gert Günther Hoffmann (21 February 1929 – 17 November 1997) was a German actor and director. He achieved fame in German film and television as a voice actor in dubbing.

He was the official voice of Sean Connery in the German language, as well as of Paul Newman, William Shatner in Star Trek (both TOS and most of the theatrical films) and Patrick Macnee in The Avengers for German TV.

Partial filmography

 The Falling Star (1950) - von Aster (voice, uncredited)
 Le banquet des fraudeurs (1952)
 The Perfect Couple (1954) - Klaus Peter Hörrmann
 Love Without Illusions (1955) - Fritz
 The Day the Rains Came (1959) - Willi
 Burning Sands (1960) - Rosen
 Ordered to Love (1961) - Oberleutnant Mertens
 Café Oriental (1962) - Michael (voice, uncredited)
 The Invisible Dr. Mabuse (1962) - FBI Agent Joe Como (voice, uncredited)
 Her Most Beautiful Day (1962) - Erich Seidel
 Breakfast in Bed (1963) - Victor H. Armstrong (voice, uncredited)
 Apache Gold (1963) - Old Shatterhand (voice, uncredited)
 Hafenpolizei (1964, TV Series) - Staffler
 Goldfinger (1964) - James Bond (German version)
 The Desperado Trail (1965) - Old Shatterhand (voice, uncredited)
 Manhattan Night of Murder (1965) - Eriksen (voice, uncredited)
 Um Null Uhr schnappt die Falle zu (1966) - Lew Hutton
 Kiss Kiss, Kill Kill (1966) - Jo Louis Walker / 'Kommissar X' (voice, uncredited)
 Kommissar X – Drei gelbe Katzen (1966) - Jo Louis Walker / 'Kommissar X' (voice, uncredited)
 Kommissar X – In den Klauen des goldenen Drachen (1966) - Jo Louis Walker / 'Kommissar X' (voice, uncredited)
 Winnetou and the Crossbreed (1966) - Old Shatterhand (voice, uncredited)
 Die Rechnung – eiskalt serviert (1966) - George Davis (voice, uncredited)
 Death Trip (1967) - Jo Louis Walker / 'Kommissar X' (voice, uncredited)
 Mister Dynamit - Morgen küßt euch der Tod (1967) - Bob Urban / Mr. Dynamit (voice, uncredited)
 Kommissar X - Drei blaue Panther (1968) - Jo Louis Walker / 'Kommissar X' (voice, uncredited)
 The Long Day of Inspector Blomfield (1968) - Mac O'Hara
 Radhapura - Endstation der Verdammten (1968) - Steve (German version, voice, uncredited)
  (1968, TV Series) - Renzyk
 The Valley of Death (1968) - Old Shatterhand (voice, uncredited)
 Dead Body on Broadway (1969) - Jerry Cotton (voice, uncredited)
 Rote Lippen, Sadisterotica (1969) - Mr. Radeck (voice, uncredited)
 Kommissar X – Drei goldene Schlangen (1969) - Jo Louis Walker / 'Kommissar X' (voice, uncredited)
 Hänsel und Gretel verliefen sich im Wald (1970) - Narrator (voice, uncredited)
 Der Kommissar (1970, TV Series) - Leppich
 Sonderdezernat K1 (1972–1982, TV Series) - Kriminalobermeister Arnold Matofski
 Lokaltermin: Die schwarze Hand (1973, TV Series) - Prosecutor
 Dschungelmädchen für zwei Halunken (1974) - Jim (voice)
 No Gold for a Dead Diver (1974) - Erzähler (voice, uncredited)
  (1976) - Wilutzki
 Derrick (1984, TV Series) - Kommissar Wobeck
 The Old Fox (1985, TV Series) - Dr. Hans Leonhard

External links

Gert Günther Hoffmann at synchrondatenbank.de
Hörproben: Gert Günther Hoffmann für Lex Barker
Grab von Gert Günther Hoffmann in Oberhaching

1929 births
1997 deaths
German male film actors
German male television actors
German male voice actors
German television directors
Male actors from Berlin
20th-century German male actors